Noce is a village in Tuscany, central Italy, administratively a frazione of the comune of Vicopisano, province of Pisa. At the time of the 2001 census its population was 77.

Noce is about 14 km from Pisa and 6 km from Vicopisano.

References 

Frazioni of the Province of Pisa